Reinaldo is a Spanish and Portuguese language given name for males (the English form is Reynold). It may refer to:

Football
Reinaldo Merlo (born 1950), Argentine former footballer and manager
Reinaldo Gomes (born 1954), Portuguese football striker born Maurício Zacarias Reinaldo Rodrigues Gomes
Reinaldo (footballer, born 1957), Brazilian football striker born José Reinaldo de Lima
Reinaldo Felisbino (born 1962), Brazilian footballer better known as Lela
Reinaldo (footballer, born 1965), Portuguese football forward born Reinaldo Almeida Lopes da Silva
Reinaldo (footballer, born 1976), Brazilian footballer forward Reinaldo Rosa dos Santos
Reinaldo (footballer, born 1979), Brazilian football forward born Reinaldo da Cruz Oliveira
Reinaldo Gaúcho (born 1980), Brazilian football striker born Reinaldo de Morais Peres
Reinaldo (footballer, born June 1980), Brazilian football striker born Reinaldo de Souza
Reinaldo (footballer, born February 1980), Brazilian football forward born Reinaldo José da Silva
Reinaldo (footballer, born 1984) (born 1984), Brazilian footballer born Reinaldo Elias da Costa
Reinaldo Alagoano (born 1986), Brazilian football striker Reinaldo Gonçalves Félix
Reinaldo (footballer, born 1989), Brazilian footballer born Reinaldo Manoel da Silva
Reinaldo (footballer, born 2001), Brazilian football forward born Reinaldo Nascimento Satorno

Other
Reinaldo Arenas (1943–1990), Cuban poet, novelist and playwright
José Reinaldo Tavares (born 1939), Brazilian politician
Reinaldo Lizardi (born 1954), Venezuelan sprinter
Reinaldo Patterson (born 1956), Cuban javelin thrower

Spanish masculine given names
Portuguese masculine given names